Kadan Vaangi Kalyaanam  is a 1958 Indian Tamil-language satirical comedy film directed by L. V. Prasad. The film stars R. Ganesh, Savithri and Jamuna. It was simultaneously shot in Telugu as Appu Chesi Pappu Koodu, which was released the following year.

Plot 

Rao Bahadur Thirumalingam Pillai borrows from all and sundry, and spends relentlessly. Zamindar Karunakaram Pillai is an innocent simpleton, and a good man. He is on the quest for the perfect match for his granddaughter Manjula. Thirumalingam Pillai wants his London-returned son, Dr. Thiyagarajan to marry Manjula and take all of Karunakaram Pillai's assets. Thiyagarajan is married to Leela, who is pretending to be a maid-servant and works in Thiyagarajan's home. Manjula is in love with Nagarajan, Leela's brother, who reciprocates and is jailed for being a revolutionary and a part of the independence struggle. Nagarajan is released from jail, and to set the affairs straight and teach Thirumalingam Pillai a lesson, he pretends to be a big-time Zamindar and stays in Karunakaram Pillai's home, who now wants Nagarajan to marry Manjula. Thiyagarajan gets involved in the drama without anyone's invite or knowledge, thus producing situational humor by posing as a prospective groom for Manjula and flirting with his maid/wife much to his father's horror. Confusion and comedy follow, while in the end Thirumalingam Pillai learns his lesson and all the pairs are united.

Cast 

Male cast
 R. Ganesh as Nagarajan
 T. S. Balaiah as Dharmalingam Pillai
 K. A. Thangavelu as Namasivayam
 T. R. Ramachandran as Thiyagarajan
 S. V. Ranga Rao as Karunakaram Pillai
 K. Sarangapani as Chokkalingam
 A. Karunanidhi-Pakkirisami as Theatre crew
 R. Nageshwara Rao as Wrestler Bheeman
 V. M. Ezhumalai as Subbaiah
 Sattam Pillai Venkatraman as Chettiar
 L. Narayana Rao as Mistress' father
 Vathiraj as Kittu

Female cast
 Savithri as Manjula
 Jamuna as Leela
 E. V. Saroja as Usha
 T. P. Muthulakshmi as Visalam
Gevacolor dance
 E. V. Saroja

Soundtrack 
The music was composed by S. Rajeswara Rao, while the lyrics were written by Thanjai N. Ramaiah Dass.

Reception 
Kanthan of Kalki called it a film worth watching if one wanted to laugh, not cry.

References

External links 
 

1950s satirical films
1950s Tamil-language films
1958 comedy films
1958 films
Films directed by L. V. Prasad
Indian comedy films
Indian satirical films